Ricardo Bagadur  (born 16 September 1995) is a Croatian professional footballer who plays as a centre-back for Croatia Zmijavci.

Club career

Rijeka
Bagadur, a product of the club's Academy, only featured once in an official game for HNK Rijeka. His made his official début on 9 October 2013 (age 18) in the club's all-time record win (11–0) over Zmaj Blato in Round 1 of the 2013–14 Croatian Cup, when he replaced the injured defender Luka Marić after 30 minutes. In early 2014, Bagadur was loaned to Pomorac in the 2. HNL. Following his return from loan, he appeared in Rijeka II's season opener in the 3. HNL, when he scored a brace in an away win against Zelina on 30 August 2014.

Fiorentina
In September 2014, ACF Fiorentina signed Bagadur on a three-year deal for a reported fee of €500,000. Bagadur made his Serie A début on 18 May 2015, in a 3–0 home win against Parma, when he replaced defender Gonzalo Rodríguez after 87 minutes.

Salernitana
On 13 January 2016, Bagadur was loaned to Salernitana for the remainder of the season.

Benevento
On 24 August 2016, Bagadur was loaned to Benevento for the remainder of the season.

Brescia
On 26 July 2017, Brescia signed Bagadur from Fiorentina for an undisclosed fee.

Career statistics

Honours
HNK Rijeka
Croatian Super Cup: 2014

References

1995 births
Living people
Footballers from Rijeka
Association football defenders
Croatian footballers
Croatia youth international footballers
HNK Rijeka players
HNK Rijeka II players
NK Pomorac 1921 players
ACF Fiorentina players
U.S. Salernitana 1919 players
Benevento Calcio players
Brescia Calcio players
FeralpiSalò players
NK Osijek players
NK Hrvatski Dragovoljac players
NK Varaždin (2012) players
Serie A players
Serie B players
Serie C players
Croatian Football League players
First Football League (Croatia) players
Croatian expatriate footballers
Expatriate footballers in Italy
Croatian expatriate sportspeople in Italy